The FS E.444 is a class of Italian railways electric locomotives. They were introduced in the course of the 1960s until 1975. Starting from 1989, all E.444s were upgraded as E.444R.

The locomotives are nicknamed Tartaruga (tortoise). The original E.444 class carried a cabside cartoon of a speeding tortoise.

History

E.444 standard
The E.444 locomotive was designed in the 1960s as the first Italian electric locomotive capable to reach  (in that period first high-speed trains like the Japanese Shinkansen and the French TGV were appearing). Italian railways could boast fast trains like the ETR 200, but they were getting old and the Pendolino project was just in its early phases.

The frontal part was improved and made more aerodynamic. A characteristic livery with two blue stripes on a pale grey background was adopted. The first 50 units proved successful, and the Ferrovie dello Stato (FS) ordered 60 more to be built starting from 1972. 16 units were adapted for feeding at 1.5 kV DC. During 1974 two  locomotives (units 056 and 057) were provided with a "shunt chopper" system (later the modifications applied were rolled back, making the two units identical to standard once again), while in 1975 the E.444.005 adopted a "full chopper" electronic system,  which was later also adopted on the E.632/633 classes, and which granted a  peak power.

Curiously, the fact that the E.444s were often used on old lines and coupled to not advanced coaches, usually hampered their performances. For example, only with the adoption of second-generation coaches, like the Grand Comfort type, trains driven by E.444 could replace the old ETR 300 in the Milan-Rome fast service.

E.444R
The introduction of fast lines showed the age of the E.444. It was therefore commissioned a program to upgrade all units to a new standard. That stator groups and the braking system were adapted for high speed service, while later it was also decided to update the driving cabin, which had been always noisy at high speed. A new, profiled frontal was thus adopted, together with a pearl grey-red livery. The modified units (for a total of 97) were re-christened E.444R ("R" standing for riqualificazione, meaning "re-qualification", but also known as "Ribollita" derisively among personnel, meaning "Reheated soup").

E.444R are in widespread service with FS-Trenitalia for fast Intercity and express services.

As part of Trenitalia's plan to retire older types of locomotives (such as the Caimano, Tigre and Tartaruga), the E.444Rs are now undergoing final retirement due to lack of newer safery features. By June 2020, they are no longer used in revenue services, instead being used to tow rolling stock for scrap or work trains.

Notes

References 

3000 V DC locomotives
E.444
Bo′Bo′ locomotives
Railway locomotives introduced in 1967
Standard gauge locomotives of Italy
Railway locomotives introduced in 1965
Passenger locomotives
Bo′Bo′ electric locomotives of Europe